South Korean may refer to:
 Something of, from, or related to South Korea, a country in East Asia, in the southern half of the Korean Peninsula. For information about the South Korean people, see:
 Demographics of South Korea
 Culture of South Korea
 The Korean language as spoken in South Korea

See also 
 Koreans
 South Korean cuisine
 

Language and nationality disambiguation pages